An American Water Landmark is a landmark within the United States, Canada, or Mexico that is a historic location and is associated in some way with water. The American Water Works Association has designated American Water Landmarks since 1969.

The following is the list of structures given the American Water Landmark designation:

See also

Water supply infrastructure on the National Register of Historic Places - U.S. sites

References

Water supply infrastructure in the United States
Infrastructure in Canada
Tourist attractions in Canada
Lists of buildings and structures in Canada
Lists of buildings and structures in the United States
Lists of places in the United States
Water supply infrastructure
Heritage registers